Fazelabad or Fazlabad or Fazilabad may refer to:
 Fayzabad, Badakhshan, Afghanistan
 Fazelabad, Golestan, Iran
 Fazelabad, Azadshahr, Golestan Province, Iran
 Fazelabad, Ilam, Iran
 Fazlabad, Isfahan, Iran
 Fazelabad-e Talkhab, Kohgiluyeh and Boyer-Ahmad Province, Iran
 Fazelabad, Lorestan, Iran
 Fazlabad, Markazi, Iran
 Fazelabad, Razavi Khorasan
 Fazlabad, Dargaz, Razavi Khorasan Province, Iran
 Fazlabad, Sabzevar, Razavi Khorasan Province, Iran
 Fazelabad, South Khorasan, Iran
 Fazlabad, South Khorasan, Iran
 Fazlabad-e Sofla, Yazd Province, Iran